The Vietnam People's Air Force Museum, Saigon or Bảo Tàng Phòng Không - Không Quân is located on Duong Thang Long (Thang Long Street) in the Phuong 4 District of Ho Chi Minh City. The museum is near to Tan Son Nhat International Airport and adjacent to the gate to Tan Son Nhut Air Base.

The museum tells the history of the Vietnam People's Air Force (VPAF) in the Second Indochina War and the Cambodian-Vietnamese War. The museum comprises one main building with a small display of uniforms and flightsuits, aircraft weaponry and engines. Outside is a static park with aircraft of the VPAF and the Republic of Vietnam Air Force.

The museum is open Tuesday-Thursday and weekends from 07:30 to 11:00 and 13:30 to 17:00. Admission is free.

Aircraft on Display
Aircraft on outside display include:

Bell UH-1 Iroquois H model
Cessna A-37 Dragonfly
Cessna U-17A
Mikoyan-Gurevich MiG-21MF
Mil Mi-8 Hip
Mil Mi-24 Hind A
Northrop F-5 Freedom Fighter

See also
Southeastern Armed Forces Museum Military Zone 7
War Remnants Museum

References

Museums in Ho Chi Minh City
Air force museums
Indochina Wars
Military and war museums in Vietnam
Vietnam War museums